Klotzschia is a genus of flowering plants belonging to the family Apiaceae.  It is native to Brazil.

Taxonomy
The genus was first described by Adelbert von Chamisso in 1833. The name Klotzschia is in honour of Johann Friedrich Klotzsch (1805–1860), a German pharmacist and botanist.

A 2021 molecular phylogenetic study suggested that it does not belong to any of the four subfamilies into which the family Apiaceae is divided. It has been suggested that it could be placed in a subfamily of its own.

Species
According to Plants of the World Online:
Klotzschia brasiliensis 
Klotzschia glaziovii 
Klotzschia rhizophylla

Gallery

References

Apiaceae
Apiaceae genera
Plants described in 1833
Flora of Brazil